Milanovac is a village in the Republic of Croatia, in the city of Virovitica, Virovitica-Podravina County.

Population

References

Populated places in Virovitica-Podravina County